Martha Matoula (born 26 April 1997) is a Greek tennis player.

Career
Matoula has a career-high singles ranking by the Women's Tennis Association (WTA) of 518, achieved on 17 October 2022. She also has a career-high doubles ranking by the WTA of 529, achieved on 30 January 2023. She has won one singles title and one doubles title at tournaments of the ITF Women's Circuit. 

Matoula competes for Greece in the Billie Jean King Cup, where she has a win/loss record of 1–0.

She attended college at the University of Tulsa (2015–2019).

ITF Circuit finals

Singles: 4 (1 title, 3 runner-ups)

Doubles: 4 (1 title, 3 runner-ups)

References

External links
 
 
 
 Martha Matoula at the University of Tulsa

1997 births
Living people
Greek female tennis players
Sportspeople from Thessaloniki
Tulsa Golden Hurricane women's tennis players